A statue of Henry Campbell-Bannerman by Paul Raphael Montford stands in Stirling, Scotland. Erected in 1913, it depicts Henry Campbell-Bannerman, the former Prime Minister of the United Kingdom and Liberal Member of Parliament for Stirling Burghs. It is located on Corn Exchange Road and is close to Stirling railway station. Historic Environment Scotland notes the statue as a listed building.

See also 
 List of listed buildings in Stirling, Stirling

References

External links

1913 establishments in Scotland
1913 sculptures
Statue of Henry Campbell-Bannerman
Statue of Henry Campbell-Bannerman
Listed monuments and memorials in Scotland
Outdoor sculptures in Scotland
Paul Raphael Montford
Statues in Scotland
Statues of prime ministers of the United Kingdom
Statue of Henry Campbell-Bannerman
Henry Campbell-Bannerman
Sculptures of men in the United Kingdom